The following are the association football events of the year 1955 throughout the world.

Events
March 13 – For the first time in history of Dutch football the professionals are allowed to play for the Netherlands national football team. Against Denmark, Faas Wilkes plays his first international match for the Dutch in six years, after signing in Italy in 1949.
England - FA Cup: Newcastle United win 3-1 over Manchester City
September 21 – Dutch club PSV Eindhoven makes its European debut with a defeat (6-1) against Austria's Rapid Wien in the first round of the European Cup.

Winners club national championship

Primera – River Plate

Division 1 – Chelsea

French Division 1 – Stade de Reims

1. Deild – KR

Liga Leumit – Hapoel Petah Tikva F.C.

Serie A – A.C. Milan
 
Division A - Aberdeen

La Liga – Real Madrid
Copa del Rey – Athletic Bilbao
West-Germany
League – Rot-Weiß Essen

Domestic cups
England
FA Cup – Newcastle
Scotland 
Scottish Cup - Clyde

International tournaments
1955 British Home Championship (October 2, 1954 – April 20, 1955)

Pan American Games in Mexico City, Mexico (March 13 – April 22, 1955)
Gold Medal: 
Silver Medal: 
Bronze Medal:

Births
January 10 — Franco Tancredi, Italian footballer and manager
January 18 — Tibor Nyilasi, Hungarian international footballer
February 8 — Bruno Pezzey, Austrian international footballer (died 1994)
February 15 — Ordan Aguirre, Venezuelan international footballer
March 6 — Ray Tumbridge, English former professional footballer
March 12 — Kirk Corbin, Barbadian former professional footballer
March 13 — Bruno Conti, Italian international footballer
April 1 — Roberto Pruzzo, Italian international footballer
May 1 — Bobby Lenarduzzi, Canadian international footballer
June 21 — Michel Platini, French international footballer, 6th president of UEFA
June 28 — Heribert Weber, Austrian international footballer
July 25 — Milan Ružić, Yugoslavian international footballer (died 2014)
August 8 — Herbert Prohaska, Austrian international footballer
September 1 — Gerhard Strack, German international footballer (died 2020)
September 22 — Ludo Coeck, Belgian international footballer (died 1985)
September 25 — Karl-Heinz Rummenigge, German international footballer
October 11 — Hans-Peter Briegel, German international footballer
October 12 — Einar Jan Aas, Norwegian international footballer
November 28 — Alessandro Altobelli, Italian international footballer
December 24 — Cees Schapendonk, Dutch international footballer

Deaths

January
 November 11 – Ramón Muttis, Argentine defender, runner-up of the 1930 FIFA World Cup. (55)

References

 
Association football by year